This is a list of notable photovoltaics (PV) companies. 

Grid-connected solar photovoltaics (PV) is the fastest growing energy technology in the world, growing from a cumulative installed capacity of 7.7 GW in 2007, to 320 GW in 2016. In 2016, 93% of the global PV cell manufacturing capacity utilizes crystalline silicon (cSi) technology, representing a commanding lead over rival forms of PV technology, such as cadmium telluride (CdTe), amorphous silicon (aSi), and copper indium gallium selenide (CIGS). In 2016, manufacturers in China and Taiwan met the majority of global PV module demand, accounting for 68% of all modules, followed by the rest of Asia at 14%. The United States and Canada manufactured 6%, and Europe manufactured a mere 4%. In 2021 China produced about 80% of the polysilicon, 95% of wafers, 80% of cells and 70% of modules. Module production capacity reached 460 GW with crystalline silicon technology assembly accounting for 98%.

Photovoltaics companies include PV capital equipment producers, cell manufacturers, panel manufacturers and installers. The list does not include silicon manufacturing companies.

Photovoltaic manufacturers

Top 10 by year

Summary

According to EnergyTrend, the 2011 global top ten polysilicon, solar cell and solar module manufacturers by capacity were found in countries including People's Republic of China, United States, Taiwan, Germany, Japan, and Korea.

In 2011, the global top ten polysilicon makers by capacity were GCL, Hemlock, OCI, Wacker, LDK, REC, MEMC/SunEdison, Tokuyama, LCY and Woongjin, represented by People's Republic of China, United States, Taiwan, Germany, Japan and South Korea.

Historical rankings
In 2015, GCL System Integration Technology Company made an increase of 500%, topping 2.5-2.7 GW, which puts it at seventh rank, overtaking Yingli Green, compared to 0.5 GW in 2014. Their solar PV module production appears to have reached a 3.7 GW capacity at the end of 2015.

Solar modules, as the final products to be installed to generate electricity, are regarded as the major components to be selected by customers willing to choose solar PV energy. Solar module manufacturers must be sure that their products can be sustainable for application periods of more than 25 years. As a result, major solar module producers have their products tested by publicly recognized testing organizations and guarantee their durable efficiency rate for a certain number of years. The solar PV market has been growing for the past few years. According to solar PV research company PVinsights, worldwide shipments of solar modules in 2011 was around 25 GW, and the shipment year-over-year growth was around 40%. The top five solar module producers in 2011 were: Suntech, First Solar, Yingli, Trina, and Canadian. The top five solar module companies possessed 51.3% market share of solar modules, according to PVinsights' market intelligence report.

Top 10 solar cell producers

According to an annual market survey by the photovoltaics trade publication Photon International, global production of photovoltaic cells and modules in 2009 was 12.3 GW. The top ten manufacturers accounted for 45% of this total. 
In 2010, a tremendous growth of solar PV cell shipments doubled the solar PV cell market size. According to the solar PV market research company PVinsights, Suntech topped the ranking of solar cell production. Most of the top ten solar PV producers doubled their shipment in 2010 and five of them were over one gigawatt shipments. The top ten solar cell producers dominated the market with an even higher market share, say 50~60%, with respect to an assumed twenty gigawatt cell shipments in 2010.
 

Quarterly ranking

Although yearly ranking is as listed above, quarterly ranking can indicate which company can sustain particular conditions such as price adjustment, government feed-in tariff change, and weather conditions. In 2Q11, First Solar regained the top spot in solar module shipments from Suntech. From the 2Q11 results, four phenomena should be noticed: thin film leader First Solar still dominates; more centralization in the solar module market; Chinese companies soared; and the giga-watt game is prevailing (according to the latest solar model shipment report by PVinsigts).

Thin film ranking

Thin film solar cells are commercially used in several technologies, including cadmium telluride (CdTe), copper indium gallium diselenide (CIGS), and amorphous and other thin-film silicon (a-Si, TF-Si). In 2013, thin-film declined to 9% of worldwide PV production.

In 2009, thin films represented 16.8% of total global production, up from 12.5% in 2008. The top ten thin-film producers were:

 1100.0 MW First Solar
 123.4 MW Suntech solar
 94.0 MW Sharp
 60.0 MW HELIOSPHERA
 50.0 MW Sungen Solar
 50.0 MW Trony
 50.0 MW Moser Baer
 43.0 MW Solar Frontier
 42.0 MW Mitsubishi
 40.0 MW Kaneka Corporation
 40.0 MW Vtech Solar
 30.0 MW Würth Solar
 30.0 MW Bosch (formerly Ersol)
 30.0 MW EPV

1 Estimated

2011 global top 10 polysilicon manufacturers by capacity

On the other hand, the 2011 global top ten solar cell makers by capacity are dominated by both Chinese and Taiwanese companies, including Suntech, JA Solar, Trina, Yingli, Motech, Gintech, Canadian Solar, NeoSolarPower, Hanwha Solar One and JinkoSolar.

2011 global top 10 solar cell manufacturers by capacity

In terms of solar module by capacity, the 2011 global top ten are Suntech, LDK, Canadian Solar, Trina, Yingli, Hanwha Solar One, Solar World, Jinko Solar, Sunneeg and Sunpower, represented by makers in People's Republic of China and Germany.

2011 global top 10 solar module manufacturers by capacity

In terms of wafer and cell capacities, both makers from Taiwan and China have demonstrated significant year over year growth from 2010 to 2011.

China and Taiwan production capacity

Solar photovoltaic production by country
China now manufactures more than half of the world's solar photovoltaics. Its production has been rapidly escalating. In 2001 it had less than 1% of the world market. In contrast, in 2001 Japan and the United States combined had over 70% of world production. By 2011 they produced around 15%.

Other companies
Other notable companies include:Land of in giants: PV majors making waves Renewable Energy World, 15 March

 Anwell Solar, Hong Kong, China
 Ascent Solar, Tucson, Arizona, US
 Cool Earth Solar, California, US
 Dyesol, Canberra, Australia
 Eurosolar, Germany
 Global Solar, Tucson, Arizona, US
 GreenSun Energy, Jerusalem, Israel
 Hanwha, Seoul, South Korea
 HelioVolt, Austin, Texas, US
 Hitachi, Japan
 IBC SOLAR, Germany
 International Solar Electric Technology, Chatsworth, California, US
 Isofotón, Malaga, Spain
 Konarka Technologies, Inc., Lowell, Massachusetts, US
 LDK Solar, Xinyu, China
 Meyer Burger, Thun, Switzerland
 Miasolé, California, US
 Mitsubishi Electric, Tokyo, Japan
 Nanosolar, San Jose, California, US
 Odersun, Frankfurt Oder, Germany
 Panasonic Corporation Osaka, Japan
 PowerFilm, Inc., Ames, Iowa, US
 Renewable Energy Corporation, Norway
 Schott Solar, Germany
 Signet Solar, California, US
 Skyline Solar, Mountain View, California, US
 SolarEdge, Grass Valley, California, US
 SolarPark Korea, Wanju, South Korea
 SolarWorld, Bonn, Germany
 Solimpeks, Munich, Germany
 SoloPower, San Jose, California, US
 Spectrolab, Inc., Sylmar, California, US
 Sulfurcell, company has changed name to Soltecture in 2011, Germany
 SunEdison
 Suniva, Norcross, Georgia, US
 Sun Power Corporation, San Jose, California, US
 Targray Technology International, Kirkland, Quebec, Canada
 Tenksolar, Minneapolis, Minnesota, US
 Topray Solar, China
 Toshiba, Tokyo, Japan
 Unirac, Albuquerque, New Mexico, US
 Wagner & Co., Germany
 Wirsol, Waghäusel, Germany
 Xinyi Solar, Wuhu, China

List of solar panel factories

Below is a list of solar panel factories. It lists actual factories only, former plants are below this first table.

Closed solar panel factories

See also

List of CIGS companies
List of concentrating solar thermal power companies
List of energy storage projects
List of silicon producers
Renewable energy industry
Silicon Module Super League
Solar cell
Dye-sensitized solar cell
Solar inverter
Power optimizer
Applied Materials, a solar cell capital equipment producer

Notes

References

External links
"Explosive Growth Reshuffles Top 10 Solar Ranking"

"Solar Home System"
"BLDC Ceiling Fan, Ceiling Fan, Manufacturers, Price, Suppliers, India"

Electrical-engineering-related lists
Photovoltaics companies
Photovoltaics companies